Tanjim Ahmad Sohel Taj (born 5 January 1970), better known as just Sohel Taj, is a fitness and health activist, body-builder and retired Bangladesh Awami League politician and former State Minister of Home Affairs. He is the son of Bangladesh's first Prime Minister Tajuddin Ahmad.

Early life
Taj was born in Dhaka on 5 January 1970 to Tajuddin Ahmad, who was the first Prime Minister of Bangladesh and Syeda Zohra Tajuddin, a former convenor and presidium member of Bangladesh Awami League. He has three sisters, Sharmin Ahmad Reepi, Simeen Hussain Rimi and Mahjabin Ahmad Mimi. He obtained bachelor of business administration degree from the American University in Bulgaria and masters from Gordon University in the United States in 2008.

Career
Taj was elected a member of Parliament in 2001 with Bangladesh Awami League nomination. He served as a member of standing committee on the ministry of youth and sports. He was re-elected from the same constituency in 2008 and joined the then Prime Minister Sheikh Hasina's cabinet as the state minister of home affairs on 6 January 2009 and resigned from the position on 31 May the same year.

Taj resigned from Bangladesh's parliament, where he had represented the Gazipur-4 constituency on 23 April 2012. His sister Simeen Hussain Rimi was later elected MP to replace him in his former constituency.

Sohel Taj launched the health and fitness related hit television show Hotline Commando on 20 July 2019 focusing on social issues of Bangladesh. He is the creator and host of the show. The program aired on private satellite channel RTV and is scheduled to run for 12 episodes. Due to Covid-19, the show has been on break after airing 6 episodes. It has reached a combined viewership (TV and social media) of over 20 million.

References

1970 births
Living people
Awami League politicians
8th Jatiya Sangsad members
9th Jatiya Sangsad members
State Ministers of Home Affairs (Bangladesh)
People from Kapasia Upazila
Bangladeshi bodybuilders
21st-century Bengalis
20th-century Bengalis